OH 24 (Olduvai Hominid № 24, nicknamed "Twiggy") is a fossilized skull of the species Homo habilis. It was discovered in Olduvai Gorge, Tanzania by Peter Nzube in 1968. The skull was found crushed almost flat and was therefore named after the famously skinny model of the time Twiggy. Estimated at about 1.8 mya (million years old), the cranium was found crushed flat and cemented together with a mass coating of limestone. It is now a Smithsonian exhibit item.

Originally, there was very little interest placed on the discovery of the skull, but after much effort by scientist Ron Clarke, the skull was finally reconstructed and examined thoroughly. Despite this effort, there still is a good deal of distortion from the fossilization processes that took place. The small cranial capacity estimated at about 590-600 cc (cubic centimeters) is in part attributed to this cranial distortion. OH 24's face is described as being prognathic (projecting forward under the nose), as in other fossils from the Homo habilis family, but not quite to the extent of earlier Australopithecus species. Besides manifesting lesser prognathism than the australopithecines, OH 24 also portrays a larger cranial vault, indicating an expansion in brain size from its ancestor, and the reduction of facial prognathisim typical of the evolution of early Homo.

The individual's third molars had erupted, which indicates that OH 24- "Twiggy" was an adult at death. Yet, these molars show no sign of wear (the points on the crowns of the teeth are still sharp, and show little sign of abrasion by rough food matter), indicating that this individual died soon after the eruption of these molars. Like the other fossils of Homo habilis, OH 24 also manifests the slightly small teeth set in a U-shaped arch.

Being one of the oldest fossils of  Homo habilis, OH 24 has been used to settle many disputes about splitting some of the early Homo fossils that have been found into Homo rudolfensis and Homo habilis, or lumping them together into one single species, Homo habilis. Some of the highly disputed fossils are KNM-ER 1813 which most agree is a female Homo habilis and KNM-ER 1470 which many argue has various anatomical differences to the previously known Homo habilis fossils that should make it be classified into the Homo rudolfensis species.

See also 
 List of fossil sites (with link directory)
 List of hominina (hominid) fossils (with images)
 KNM-ER 1813
 KNM-ER 1470

References

External links 

Archaeology Info

Homo habilis fossils
Fossils of Tanzania
Prehistoric Tanzania